Pirates on Horseback is a 1941 American Western film directed by Lesley Selander and written by Ethel La Blanche and J. Benton Cheney. The film stars William Boyd, Russell Hayden, Andy Clyde, Eleanor Stewart, Morris Ankrum and William Haade. The film was released on May 23, 1941, by Paramount Pictures.

Plot
Hoppy and the boys are out to take back Trudy Pendleton's mine after it was taken from her. After they find the mine, Hoppy gets into a fight with gambler Ace Gibson.

Cast 
William Boyd as Hopalong Cassidy
Russell Hayden as Lucky Jenkins
Andy Clyde as California Carlson
Eleanor Stewart as Trudy Pendleton
Morris Ankrum as Ace Gibson
William Haade as Henchman Bill Watson
Dennis Moore as Henchman Jud Carter
Henry Hall as Sheriff John Blake
Britt Wood as Ben Pendleton

References

External links 
 

1941 films
American black-and-white films
1940s English-language films
Paramount Pictures films
American Western (genre) films
1941 Western (genre) films
Films directed by Lesley Selander
Hopalong Cassidy films
1940s American films